Imberhorne School is a comprehensive school in East Grinstead, West Sussex, England, which admits children between the ages of 11 and 18. The school has a roll of 1,650, including 300 in the Sixth Form, and is on two sites, Windmill Lane and Imberhorne Lane.

The headteacher is Mr Walker. In 2004, the school was awarded Artsmark Silver and Sportsmark for excellence in these areas.

Many pupils achieve higher than average results and the school ranks within the top 10 in West Sussex. In 2008 GCSE results, 69% students achieved five or more A*–C passes, compared to a national average of 63%. The Sixth Form provides both academic, BTEC, and vocational courses.

Facilities

Imberhorne is split into two sites. The Windmill Lane site, which is the old county grammar school, houses years 7, 8 and 9 (key stage 3) and the Imberhorne Lane site is used by years 10, 11 (key stage 4) and the Sixth form. These are commonly referred to as ‘Lower’ and ‘Upper’ school respectively, by both the students and staff. The upper site also contains the DiGasson Sports Facility, consisting of a drama/dance studio, sports centre, changing rooms, sports classrooms and the medical centre, it is commonly used both internally by the school and by external groups.

Performance

In 2010, Imberhorne achieved an 'outstanding' Ofsted rating after a full inspection.

In 2018, Imberhorne was ranked against every state funded school in the country in the Best Schools Guide. The guide awarded schools a one-to-five rating across attainment, progress, attendance and outcomes. Imberhorne scored four out of five in every category, ranking it as East Grinstead's top school. It was ranked 9th overall in West Sussex, and 773rd in the country. Imberhorne achieved a higher rank than Sackville School, the other secondary school in the town, who were ranked as the 29th best school in West Sussex and 1564 in the country.

Sports

In 2015, the Imberhorne under-15's rugby team achieved notoriety for reaching the 6th round of the NatWest Schools Cup Vase competition. The team achieved the schools highest place finish in its history, and beat many teams from more prestigious schools.

Notable alumni

David Earl, actor and comedian: Derek, Cemetery Junction, Extras
Richard Fairbrass of Right Said Fred
Fred Fairbrass of Right Said Fred
Mark Haysom , author
 Stuart Simmonds, cricketer
Bruce Herbelin-Earle, actor
Sam Tutty, Olivier Award-winning actor: Dear Evan Hansen
Cleo Demetriou, Olivier Award-winning actress: Matilda the Musical
Nick Van Eede of Cutting Crew

Notable staff
 Paul Harvey, pianist, former Head of Music

References

External links

 A Brief History of Imberhorne School
 Ofsted report

East Grinstead
Community schools in West Sussex
Secondary schools in West Sussex
Educational institutions established in 1970
1970 establishments in England